Trumptonshire is a fictional county created by Gordon Murray, in which the Trumptonshire Trilogy of Camberwick Green (1966), Trumpton (1967), and Chigley (1969) are located. Trumptonshire is populated by characters portrayed by 8-inch (20 cm) tall stop-motion puppets. Trumpton is a market town with an impressive town hall and clock tower; Camberwick Green and Chigley are two nearby villages.

Trumptonshire communities
From the dialogue of Camberwick Green it is discovered that Wellchester is the main city of Trumptonshire county. In the Chigley episode "The Balloon", viewers are given sweeping aerial views across the Trumptonshire countryside and skyline; from this it is seen that Trumptonshire possesses a large medieval castle, although it is never named in the programmes.

Murray is not known to have provided any definitive map of Trumptonshire. The only map regularly seen in the programmes is located in the control room of Trumpton fire station, and analysis has suggested that it actually depicts the area around Florence in Italy. Nonetheless, the following Trumptonshire settlements are identified in the storylines of the programmes.

Camberwick Common, bordering Camberwick Green, is not visited in the programmes, but is referenced as a usual place of training for the Pippin Fort soldier boys. There are clay pits nearby.
Camberwick Green is a quiet village community with a Post Office and several village shops, as was still common in late 1960s England. The wider parish includes outlying properties such as Colley's Mill, Bell's farm, Tripp's Dairy, and Pippin Fort. The village is central to the first Trumptonshire series, and features in all three series. It does not feature in Trumpton.  Who writes this??
Chigley is another quiet village community, but with a less defined village centre. It is located a short distance from Camberwick Green. It features some heavy industry, including Cresswell's Chigley Biscuit factory, and Treddle's Wharf, as well as cottage industry, represented by the Chigley Pottery. A canal (named as the Trumpton Canal) and a river (unnamed in the programmes) run through the village. It is central to the third and final Trumptonshire series.
Trimbridge is the next village after Chigley along the river; the river bridge at Trimbridge is the first crossing point of the river after Chigley bridge; there is a direct road from Chigley to Trimbridge, running alongside the river.
Trumpton is the local market town, with a local corporation and mayor, and numbers of infrastructure features for the wider region, most famously the Fire Brigade. There are various shops, and a large public park, and many streets of terraced housing. Some residents (such as the Mintons) are depicted as living in cottages on the outer edge of the town. It has (amongst other facilities) a hospital, swimming pool, public library, waterworks, and gasworks. It is central to the second Trumptonshire series.
Wellchester is the county's large town or city community, some distance from Trumpton, and with large department stores. The character Mrs Honeyman ventures to Wellchester (in Camberwick Green episode 6) having heard that one of the department stores has a sale on hats.
Winkstead Hall estate is the home of Lord Belborough and his domestic staff, located on the edge of Chigley. It is depicted in every Chigley episode.
Wintlebury is another Trumptonshire town. The programmes were made in an era in which many British communities were adjusting to life without local railway services, following the Beeching cuts. The only rail service depicted in the series is Lord Belborough's heritage railway, but the nearest mainline railway station is said to be in Wintlebury, from which there are direct trains to London. Driving directions quoted in the series reveal that Wintlebury is reached from Chigley by driving through Trumpton.

Actual locations
The true locations on which the fictional communities were based remain uncertain. According to Murray, the three title communities are however based on real locations one and a half miles from each other at the corners of an equilateral triangle. The real-life locations most frequently cited are Wivelsfield Green (Camberwick Green), Plumpton (Trumpton), and Chailey (Chigley), historically known as Chagley, which are neighbouring communities in a roughly triangular configuration in East Sussex. In such an explanation the city of Wellchester could be Chichester. These locations have been proposed as the Trumptonshire inspiration in the mainstream British media.

DVD
BBC Studios and Post Production's Digital Media Services team remastered all 39 episodes of the Trumptonshire Trilogy in 2011 for DVD release, cleaning, scanning and digitally restoring the film footage frame by frame.

References in other media
Trumptonshire was used as a hypothetical constituency by the BBC Radio 4 programme More or Less to explain how polling and voting could play out during the 2015 UK general election.

The music video for Radiohead's "Burn the Witch" single pays homage to the Trumptonshire Trilogy.

References

External links
The Trumptonshire Trilogy
BBC Radio 4 Sunday Best – Here is a Box, a Musical Box
The Story of Watch With Mother: Part 4 – "Here is a Box, a Musical Box ..."

Fictional elements introduced in 1966
Fictional counties
Fictional neighborhoods
BBC children's television shows
Counties of England
Fictional locations in the United Kingdom